The 2018–19 National League season was the 81st season of Swiss professional ice hockey and the second season as the National League (NL).

ZSC Lions were the defending Swiss national champions, however missed the playoffs altogether. 

SC Bern won the regular season for a third consecutive year, and went on to defeat regular season runners-up EV Zug in the playoff finals 4–1 to claim their 16th Swiss championship, and third in four years.

The qualification series between SC Rapperswil-Jona Lakers and SC Langenthal was not played, due to SC Langenthal's home arena not meeting NL requirements, therefore SC Rapperswil-Jona Lakers would remain in the NL for the 2019–20 season.

Teams

Regular season

Player statistics

Scoring leaders

The following players led the league in points, at the conclusion of the regular season. If two or more skaters are tied (i.e. same number of points, goals and played games), all of the tied skaters are shown.

Leading goaltenders
The following goaltenders led the league in goals against average, provided that they have played at least 40% of their team's minutes, at the conclusion of the regular season.

Playoffs

Relegation playoffs – Playouts

Ranking round

Playout final
HC Davos 4–1 SC Rapperswil-Jona Lakers (3–2, 5–3, 2–3, 5–3, 3–1)

League Qualification

2018–19 Swiss League champions SC Langenthal's home arena Schoren Halle did not comply with the National League's requirements, and if promoted they would therefore have had to play their home games at an alternative arena. Initially SC Langenthal announced that they would still play the league qualification despite not intending to gain promotion. However on April 5, SC Langenthal announced that they would not be contesting the League Qualification, meaning SC Rapperswil-Jona Lakers would remain in the National League for the 2019–20 season.

References

External links
 
 

1
Swiss
National League (ice hockey) seasons